TV8 is a Turkish free-to-air television channel owned by MNG Media Group, which started broadcasting on 22 February 1999. Its current owner is Acun Medya. Aside from having national coverage on terrestrial television, it is also carried on cable operators and satellite providers like Kablo TV, Tivibu, Digiturk and D-Smart.
TV8 as a news channel started broadcasting in 2005, becoming part of the format and logo by changing the entertainment channels. The programs include music, entertainment, contests, sports, talk and news.
On March 17, 2016, TV8 announced that it had acquired the Formula 1 broadcasting rights for one season.
TV8 is the local broadcaster of TV shows like The Voice, Got Talent, Survivor and Utopia.

Programs 
2014-: Yetenek Sizsiniz Türkiye
2014-: O Ses Türkiye
2014-: Survivor
2014-: Para Bende
2014-: Ninja Warrior Türkiye
2014-: Ver Fırına
2014-: Hülya Avşar Show
2018-: MasterChef Türkiye
2015-2017: İşte Benim Stilim

Sports 
2016-: 2015-16 NBA Season
2016-: 2016-17 Premier League
2021-: Champions League
2021-: Europa League
2021-: Conference League

Series 
2014-2015: Kaçak Gelinler
2015-Maral: En Güzel Hikayem
2015-Bana Baba Dedi
2018-2019: Kızım
2018-2019: Jet Sosyete
2020-2021: Doğduğun Ev Kaderindir
2020-Kırmızı Oda
2021: Workshop
2022: Suslu Korkuluk

References

External links 
Official site 

Television stations in Turkey
Turkish-language television stations
Television channels and stations established in 1999
Mass media in Istanbul
1999 establishments in Turkey
Sarıyer